Tomorrowland is a theme land at a number of Disney theme parks around the world.

Tomorrowland may also refer to:

Arts, entertainment, and media

Music
 Tomorrowland (Black Majesty album), 2007
 Tomorrowland (Ryan Bingham album), 2012
 Tomorrowland, an American band that released a single from Burnt Hair Records

Other uses in arts, entertainment, and media
 Tomorrowland (book), a 2015 non-fiction book by Steven Kotler
 Tomorrowland (festival), an annual electronic dance music festival in Boom, Belgium
 Tomorrowland (film), a 2015 science fiction film directed by Brad Bird
 "Tomorrowland" (Mad Men), an episode of Mad Men

Other uses
 Tomorrowland Terrace, a restaurant in Tomorrowland at Disneyland in Anaheim, California, and also in Magic Kingdom at Walt Disney World in Bay Lake, Florida
 Tomorrowland Speedway, an race car track attraction in Tomorrowland in Magic Kingdom at Walt Disney World Resort in Bay Lake, Florida
 Tomorrowland Transit Authority PeopleMover, an urban mass transit PeopleMover system attraction in Tomorrowland in Magic Kingdom at the Walt Disney World Resort in Bay Lake, Florida

See also

 
 
 The World Tomorrow (disambiguation)
 Tomorrow's World (disambiguation)